Meadow Park, currently known as the LV Bet Stadium Meadow Park for sponsorship purposes, is a football ground in Borehamwood, Hertfordshire, England. It is the home ground of Boreham Wood F.C., and also hosts the home matches of Arsenal Women F.C. and Arsenal youth teams.

Meadow Park is also the name of the public park which includes the football ground, as well as children's play areas, tennis courts, multi-sports courts, interactive play, a teen shelter, football pitches, open grassland and a wildflower meadow.

History
Boreham Wood moved to Meadow Park from Eldon Avenue in 1963. A new main stand was built shortly afterwards. That was demolished in 1999 and replaced by a stand with a cantilevered roof. A new West Stand was opened in 2014. A new North Bank terrace was opened in 2019, sharing the name of one of the stands from Arsenal's traditional former home of Highbury.

Record attendance
The record attendance for the ground is 4,101, set in an FA Cup second round match against St Albans City on 6 December 2021.

References

External links

Football venues in England
Women's Super League venues
Boreham Wood F.C.
Arsenal W.F.C.
Arsenal F.C. home grounds
Sports venues in Hertfordshire
Watford F.C.
Borehamwood